The Stark effect is the shifting and splitting of spectral lines of atoms and molecules due to the presence of an external electric field. It is the electric-field analogue of the Zeeman effect, where a spectral line is split into several components due to the presence of the magnetic field. Although initially coined for the static case, it is also used in the wider context to describe the effect of time-dependent electric fields. In particular, the Stark effect is responsible for the pressure broadening (Stark broadening) of spectral lines by charged particles in plasmas. For most spectral lines, the Stark effect is either linear (proportional to the applied electric field) or quadratic with a high accuracy.

The Stark effect can be observed both for emission and absorption lines. The latter is sometimes called the inverse Stark effect, but this term is no longer used in the modern literature.

History
The effect is named after the German physicist Johannes Stark, who discovered it in 1913. It was independently discovered in the same year by the Italian physicist Antonino Lo Surdo, and in Italy it is thus sometimes called the Stark–Lo Surdo effect. The discovery of this effect contributed importantly to the development of quantum theory and Stark was awarded with the Nobel Prize in Physics in the year 1919.

Inspired by the magnetic Zeeman effect, and especially by Hendrik Lorentz's explanation of it, Woldemar Voigt performed classical mechanical calculations of quasi-elastically bound electrons in an electric field. By using experimental indices of refraction he gave an estimate of the Stark splittings. This estimate was a few orders of magnitude too low. Not deterred by this prediction, Stark undertook measurements on excited states of the hydrogen atom and succeeded in observing splittings.

By the use of the Bohr–Sommerfeld ("old") quantum theory, Paul Epstein and Karl Schwarzschild were independently able to derive equations for the linear and quadratic Stark effect in hydrogen. Four years later, Hendrik Kramers derived formulas for intensities of spectral transitions. Kramers also included the effect of fine structure, with corrections for relativistic kinetic energy and coupling between electron spin and orbital motion. The first quantum mechanical treatment (in the framework of Werner Heisenberg's matrix mechanics) was by Wolfgang Pauli. Erwin Schrödinger discussed at length the Stark effect in his  third paper on quantum theory (in which he introduced his perturbation theory), once in the manner of the 1916 work of Epstein (but generalized from the old to the new quantum theory) and once by his (first-order) perturbation approach.
Finally, Epstein reconsidered the linear and quadratic Stark effect from the point of view of the new quantum theory. He derived equations for the line intensities which were a decided improvement over Kramers's results obtained by the old quantum theory.

While the first-order-perturbation (linear) Stark effect in hydrogen is in agreement with both the old Bohr–Sommerfeld model and the quantum-mechanical theory of the atom, higher-order corrections are not. Measurements of the Stark effect under high field strengths confirmed the correctness of the new quantum theory.

Mechanism

Overview
An electric field pointing from left to right, for example, tends to pull nuclei to the right and electrons to the left. In another way of viewing it, if an electronic state has its electron disproportionately to the left, its energy is lowered, while if it has the electron disproportionately to the right, its energy is raised.

Other things being equal, the effect of the electric field is greater for outer electron shells, because the electron is more distant from the nucleus, so it travels farther left and farther right.

The Stark effect can lead to splitting of degenerate energy levels. For example, in the Bohr model, an electron has the same energy whether it is in the 2s state or any of the 2p states. However, in an electric field, there will be hybrid orbitals (also called quantum superpositions) of the 2s and 2p states where the electron tends to be to the left, which will acquire a lower energy, and other hybrid orbitals where the electron tends to be to the right, which will acquire a higher energy. Therefore, the formerly degenerate energy levels will split into slightly lower and slightly higher energy levels.

Multipole expansion

The Stark effect originates from the interaction between a charge distribution (atom or molecule) and an external electric field.
The interaction energy of a continuous charge distribution , confined within a finite volume , with an external electrostatic potential  is 

This expression is valid classically and quantum-mechanically alike.
If the potential varies weakly over the charge distribution, the multipole expansion converges fast, so only a few first terms give an accurate approximation. Namely, keeping only the zero- and first-order terms,

where we introduced the electric field  and assumed the origin 0 to be somewhere within .
Therefore, the interaction becomes

Classical macroscopic objects are usually neutral or quasi-neutral, so the first, monopole, term in the expression above is identically zero. This is also the case for a neutral atom or molecule. However, for an ion this is no longer true. Nevertheless, it is often justified to omit it in this case, too. Indeed, the Stark effect is observed in spectral lines, which are emitted when an electron "jumps" between two bound states. Since such a transition only alters the internal degrees of freedom of the radiator but not its charge, the effects of the monopole interaction on the initial and final states exactly cancel each other.

Perturbation theory
Turning now to quantum mechanics an atom or a molecule can be thought of as a collection of point charges (electrons and nuclei), so that the second definition of the dipole applies. The interaction of atom or molecule with a uniform external field is described by the operator

This operator is used as a perturbation in first- and second-order perturbation theory to account for the first- and second-order Stark effect.

First order
Let the unperturbed atom or molecule be in a g-fold degenerate state with orthonormal zeroth-order state functions . (Non-degeneracy is the special case g = 1). According to perturbation theory the first-order energies are the eigenvalues of the g × g  matrix with general element 

If g = 1 (as is often the case for electronic states of molecules)  the first-order energy becomes proportional to the expectation (average) value of the dipole operator ,

Because the electric dipole moment is a vector (tensor of the first rank), the diagonal elements of the perturbation matrix Vint vanish between states with a certain parity. Atoms and molecules possessing inversion symmetry do not have a (permanent) dipole moment and hence do not show a linear Stark effect.

In order to obtain a non-zero matrix Vint for systems with an inversion center it is necessary that some of the unperturbed functions  have opposite parity (obtain plus and minus under inversion), because only functions of opposite parity give non-vanishing matrix elements. Degenerate zeroth-order states of opposite parity occur for excited hydrogen-like (one-electron) atoms or Rydberg states. Neglecting fine-structure effects, such a state with the principal quantum number n is n2-fold degenerate and

where  is the azimuthal (angular momentum) quantum number. For instance, the excited n = 4 state contains the following  states,

The one-electron states with even  are even under parity, while those with odd  are odd under parity. Hence hydrogen-like atoms with n>1 show first-order Stark effect.

The first-order Stark effect occurs in rotational transitions of symmetric top molecules (but not for linear and asymmetric molecules). In first approximation a molecule may be seen as a rigid rotor. A symmetric top rigid rotor has the unperturbed eigenstates

with 2(2J+1)-fold degenerate energy for |K| > 0 and (2J+1)-fold degenerate energy for K=0.
Here DJMK is an element of the Wigner D-matrix. The first-order perturbation matrix  on basis of the unperturbed rigid rotor function is non-zero and can be diagonalized. This gives shifts and splittings
in  the rotational spectrum. Quantitative analysis of these Stark shift yields the permanent electric dipole moment of the symmetric top molecule.

Second order
As stated, the quadratic Stark effect is described by second-order perturbation theory. The zeroth-order eigenproblem

is assumed to be solved. The perturbation theory gives

with the components of the polarizability tensor α defined by

The energy E(2) gives the quadratic Stark effect.

Neglecting the hyperfine structure (which is often justified — unless extremely weak electric fields are considered), the polarizability tensor of atoms is isotropic,

For some molecules this expression is a reasonable approximation, too.

For the ground state  is always positive, i.e., the quadratic Stark shift is always negative.

Problems
The perturbative treatment of the Stark effect has some problems. In the presence of an electric field, states of atoms and molecules that were previously bound (square-integrable), become formally (non-square-integrable) resonances of finite width. These resonances may decay in finite time via field ionization. For low lying states and not too strong fields the decay times are so long, however, that for all practical purposes the system can be regarded as bound. For highly excited states and/or very strong fields ionization may have to be accounted for. (See also the article on the Rydberg atom).

Applications
The Stark effect is at the basis of the spectral shift measured for voltage-sensitive dyes used for imaging of the firing activity of neurons.

See also
Zeeman effect
Autler–Townes effect
Quantum-confined Stark effect
Stark spectroscopy
Inglis–Teller equation
Electric field NMR
Stark effect in semiconductor optics

References

Further reading
  (Early history of the Stark effect)
  (Chapter 17 provides a comprehensive treatment, as of 1935.)
  (Stark effect for atoms)
  (Stark effect for rotating molecules)

Atomic physics
Foundational quantum physics
Physical phenomena
Spectroscopy